Flemming Hansen (9 August 1939 – 30 April 2021) was a Danish politician representing the Conservative People's Party. He was in parliament from 10 January 1984 to 13 November 2007.

Born in Copenhagen, he was a member of parliament (Folketing) from 1984 and was the Minister of Traffic from 27 November 2001 to 12 September 2007, Minister of Nordic Co-operation from 18 June 2002 to 18 February 2005, and Minister of Energy from 18 February 2005 to 12 September 2007.

He owned shoe shops in Vejle, Fredericia, and Horsens.

References

External links
 

1939 births
2021 deaths
Government ministers of Denmark
Politicians from Copenhagen
Members of the Folketing
Transport ministers of Denmark